Brian Robinson may refer to:

Sportspeople 
Brian Robinson Jr. (born 1999), American football running back
Brian Robinson (safety), American football player
Brian Robinson (basketball) (born 1972), American basketball coach
Brian Robinson (cricketer) (born 1967), Australian cricketer
Brian Robinson (cyclist) (1930–2022), English cyclist
Brian Robinson (hiker), American long-distance hiker
Brian Robinson (rugby union) (born 1966), former Irish rugby union international player
Brian Robinson (soccer) (born 1953), Canadian soccer player

Other people 
Brian Robinson (chemist) (1940–2016), New Zealand inorganic chemist
Brian William Robinson (1939–1964), Australian criminal second last man hung in Western Australia
Brian Robinson (loyalist) (1962–1989), Northern Irish loyalist paramilitary
Brian J. Robinson, American musician
Brian S. Robinson, United States Air Force general

See also
Bryan Robinson (disambiguation)